Camillo Ricordi (born 1957) is a diabetes researcher based in Miami, FL. He currently serves as Director of the Diabetes Research Institute, a position he has held since 1996. He is the Chief Academic Officer of the Diabetes Research Institute of the University of Miami and is director of the DRI's Cell Transplant Center. He has been active in stem cell research and its applications to treating diabetes, particularly Type 1 Diabetes. He specializes in pancreatic islet transplantation

Career

Ricordi studied from 1971 to 1976 at the Scientific Lyceum in Milan and graduated Cum Laude in Medicine from the University of Milan in 1982. During his medical studies at the University of Milan he did internships at the Institute of Central Nervous System Physiology of the National Research Council (Milan, Italy) and later, as a student of internal medicine in the Internal Medicine Department of the San Raffaele Institute in Milan.

After graduating in medicine, he specialized in Gastrointestinal Surgery and Digestive Endoscopy at the University of Milan, graduating Cum Laude in 1988. During this same period he completed several complementary studies at the Washington University School of Medicine (St Louis, Missouri), in the Department of Genetics, and conducting training in Immunogenetics and Immunobiology of cell transplants.

After a period of military service in the Italian Air Force, where he worked as a medical officer with the rank of Lieutenant, he joined as Assistant Professor of Surgery in the Department of Surgery of the Division of Transplantation in the School of Medicine of the University of Pittsburgh, Pennsylvania.

His professional career has been developed in the educational and scientific field mainly. He has been Co-Director of the Executive Office of Research Leadership (2001-2003), as Senior Associate Dean of Research (2003-2006) and has chaired the Dean's Research Office (2006-2012) at the Miller School of Medicine, University of Miami.

Ricordi is Professor of Surgery at Stacy Joy Goodman, Distinguished Professor of Medicine, Professor of Biomedical Engineering and Microbiology and Immunology at the University of Miami, Florida, where he also appears as Director of the Diabetes Research Institute (DRI) and the Cell Transplant Center.

He is also a Head of the Human Cell Processing Facility, funded by NIH, which has been providing human cell products for research and clinical applications at the University of Miami, Florida, and throughout the world since 1993.

Achievements 
He was part of a team in 1986 at the Washington University in St. Louis that pioneered what is known as the islet transplant procedure, developed to address the worst cases of diabetes type 1. He is credited with developing the automated method for islet cell isolation called the "Ricordi Method.” The method includes the use of the Ricordi Chamber, for which Ricordi was awarded the Nessim Habif World Prize for Surgery at the University of Geneva in 2001. The award is given to the invention of a machine that allows progress to be made significant in a field of surgery. Ricordi's invention of the automated islet isolation method made it possible to obtain a greater number of islets of a human pancreas; before they needed up to five or six organs to carry out a transplant.

Ricordi has been published in academic and medical journals, has over 1,778 scientific publications, >50,237 citations and an H-Index of  112. He has been awarded 27 patents as an inventor. He has participated in congresses and meetings on isolation and transplantation of islets for the treatment of diabetes.

In 2021, Ricordi was named Editor in Chief of the European Review for Medical and Pharmacological Sciences. 

2022 Ricordi published the Italian bestseller "IL CODICE DELLA LONGEVITA' SANA" - Mondadori (Amazon.it) and its English edition "THE HEALTHSPAN CODE" (Amazon.com)

Awards and honors 
 2002 Provost Award from the University of Miami for its academic activity.
 2002 Outstanding Scientific Achievement Award of the ADA (American Diabetes Association) (San Francisco, CA) 
 2002 Recipient of the Carl Gustav Groth Lecture Award, Nobel Forum (Stockholm, Sweden) 
 2006 Awarded the Lois Pope LIFE International Research Award 
 2006 Paul Harris Fellowship Award (Rotary International) 
 2006 Roche Award for Outstanding Achievement in Transplant Science (Clinic) 
 2009 Knighted Republic of Italy Highest Order of Merit Knighthood decoration of Cavaliere Ufficiale 
 2010 Inducted into Association of American Physicians
 2011 Awarded D-Life's Top Award for making biggest difference in diabetes
 2008-2018 Ranked #1 world expert in transplantation of insulin producing cells for treatment of diabetes among 4,000 physicians, surgeons and scientists evaluated (Dec. 2018).
 2018 Inducted into National Academy of Inventors (Fellow)
 2019-2022 Supreme Council of the Ministry of Health of Italy

References 

1958 births
Living people
University of Milan alumni
American medical researchers
University of Miami faculty
American diabetologists
Italian emigrants to the United States